A banana is an elongated, edible fruit – botanically a berry – produced by several kinds of large herbaceous flowering plants in the genus Musa. In some countries, bananas used for cooking may be called "plantains", distinguishing them from dessert bananas. The fruit is variable in size, color, and firmness, but is usually elongated and curved, with soft flesh rich in starch covered with a rind, which may be green, yellow, red, purple, or brown when ripe. The fruits grow upward in clusters near the top of the plant. Almost all modern edible seedless (parthenocarp) bananas come from two wild species – Musa acuminata and Musa balbisiana. The scientific names of most cultivated bananas are Musa acuminata, Musa balbisiana, and Musa × paradisiaca for the hybrid Musa acuminata × M. balbisiana, depending on their genomic constitution. The old scientific name for this hybrid, Musa sapientum, is no longer used.

Musa species are native to tropical Indomalaya and Australia, and are likely to have been first domesticated in New Guinea. They are grown in 135 countries, primarily for their fruit, and to a lesser extent to make fiber, banana wine, and banana beer, and as ornamental plants. The world's largest producers of bananas in 2017 were India and China, which together accounted for approximately 38% of total production.

Worldwide, there is no sharp distinction between "bananas" and "plantains". Especially in the Americas and Europe, "banana" usually refers to soft, sweet, dessert bananas, particularly those of the Cavendish group, which are the main exports from banana-growing countries. In the US, as of 2019, these bananas, by poundage, are the most consumed fresh fruit. By contrast, Musa cultivars with firmer, starchier fruit are called "plantains". In other regions, such as Southeast Asia, many more kinds of banana are grown and eaten, so the binary distinction is not as useful and is not made in local languages.

The term "banana" is also used as the common name for the plants that produce the fruit. This can extend to other members of the genus Musa, such as the scarlet banana (Musa coccinea), the pink banana (Musa velutina), and the Fe'i bananas. It can also refer to members of the genus Ensete, such as the snow banana (Ensete glaucum) and the economically important false banana (Ensete ventricosum). Both genera are in the banana family, Musaceae.

Description

The banana plant is the largest herbaceous flowering plant. All the above-ground parts of a banana plant grow from a structure usually called a "corm". Plants are normally tall and fairly sturdy with a treelike appearance, but what appears to be a trunk is actually a "false stem" or pseudostem.

The leaves of banana plants are composed of a stalk (petiole) and a blade (lamina). The base of the petiole widens to form a sheath; the tightly packed sheaths make up the pseudostem, which is all that supports the plant. The edges of the sheath meet when it is first produced, making it tubular. As new growth occurs in the centre of the pseudostem the edges are forced apart. Cultivated banana plants vary in height depending on the variety and growing conditions. They are easily torn by the wind, resulting in the familiar frond look. When a banana plant is mature, the corm stops producing new leaves and begins to form a flower spike or inflorescence. A stem develops which grows up inside the pseudostem, carrying the immature inflorescence until eventually it emerges at the top. Each pseudostem normally produces a single inflorescence, also known as the "banana heart". (More are sometimes produced; an exceptional plant in the Philippines produced five.) After fruiting, the pseudostem dies, but offshoots will normally have developed from the base, so that the plant as a whole is perennial. In the plantation system of cultivation, only one of the offshoots will be allowed to develop in order to maintain spacing. The inflorescence contains many bracts (sometimes incorrectly referred to as petals) between rows of flowers. The female flowers (which can develop into fruit) appear in rows further up the stem (closer to the leaves) from the rows of male flowers. The ovary is inferior, meaning that the tiny petals and other flower parts appear at the tip of the ovary.

The banana fruits develop from the banana heart, in a large hanging cluster, made up of tiers (called "hands"), with up to 20 fruit to a tier. The hanging cluster is known as a bunch, comprising 3–20 tiers, or commercially as a "banana stem", and can weigh . Individual banana fruits (commonly known as a banana or "finger") average , of which approximately 75% is water and 25% dry matter (nutrient table, lower right).

The fruit has been described as a "leathery berry". There is a protective outer layer (a peel or skin) with numerous long, thin strings (the phloem bundles), which run lengthwise between the skin and the edible inner portion. The inner part of the common yellow dessert variety can be split lengthwise into three sections that correspond to the inner portions of the three carpels by manually deforming the unopened fruit. In cultivated varieties, the seeds are diminished nearly to non-existence; their remnants are tiny black specks in the interior of the fruit.

The end of the fruit opposite the stem contains a small tip distinct in texture, and often darker in color. Often misunderstood to be some type of seed or excretory vein, it is actually just the remnants from whence the banana fruit was a banana flower.

Banana equivalent radiation dose

As with all living things on earth, potassium-containing bananas emit radioactivity at low levels occurring naturally from potassium-40 (40K or K-40), which is one of several isotopes of potassium. The banana equivalent dose of radiation was developed in 1995 as a simple teaching-tool to educate the public about the natural, small amount of K-40 radiation occurring in every human and in common foods. 

The K-40 in a banana emits about 15 becquerels or 0.1 microsieverts (units of radioactivity exposure), an amount that does not add to the total body radiation dose when a banana is consumed. By comparison, the normal radiation exposure of an average person over one day is 10 microsieverts, a commercial flight across the United States exposes a person to 40 microsieverts, and the total yearly radiation exposure from the K-40 sources in a person's body is about 390 microsieverts.

Etymology
The word "banana" is thought to be of West African origin, possibly from the Wolof word , and passed into English via Spanish or Portuguese.

Taxonomy

The genus Musa was created by Carl Linnaeus in 1753. The name may be derived from Antonius Musa, physician to the Emperor Augustus, or Linnaeus may have adapted the Arabic word for banana, mauz. According to Roger Blench, the ultimate origin of musa is in the Trans–New Guinea languages, whence they were borrowed into the Austronesian languages and across Asia, via the Dravidian languages of India, into Arabic as a Wanderwort.

Musa is the type genus in the family Musaceae. The APG III system assigns Musaceae to the order Zingiberales, part of the commelinid clade of the monocotyledonous flowering plants. Some 70 species of Musa were recognized by the World Checklist of Selected Plant Families ; several produce edible fruit, while others are cultivated as ornamentals.

The classification of cultivated bananas has long been a problematic issue for taxonomists. Linnaeus originally placed bananas into two species based only on their uses as food: Musa sapientum for dessert bananas and Musa paradisiaca for plantains. More species names were added, but this approach proved to be inadequate for the number of cultivars in the primary center of diversity of the genus, Southeast Asia. Many of these cultivars were given names that were later discovered to be synonyms.

In a series of papers published from 1947 onwards, Ernest Cheesman showed that Linnaeus's Musa sapientum and Musa paradisiaca were cultivars and descendants of two wild seed-producing species, Musa acuminata and Musa balbisiana, both first described by Luigi Aloysius Colla. Cheesman recommended the abolition of Linnaeus's species in favor of reclassifying bananas according to three morphologically distinct groups of cultivars – those primarily exhibiting the botanical characteristics of Musa balbisiana, those primarily exhibiting the botanical characteristics of Musa acuminata, and those with characteristics of both. Researchers Norman Simmonds and Ken Shepherd proposed a genome-based nomenclature system in 1955. This system eliminated almost all the difficulties and inconsistencies of the earlier classification of bananas based on assigning scientific names to cultivated varieties. Despite this, the original names are still recognized by some authorities, leading to confusion.

The accepted scientific names for most groups of cultivated bananas are Musa acuminata Colla and Musa balbisiana Colla for the ancestral species, and Musa × paradisiaca L. for the hybrid M. acuminata × M. balbisiana.

Synonyms of M. × paradisiaca include
 many subspecific and varietal names of M. × paradisiaca, including M. p. subsp. sapientum (L.) Kuntze
 Musa × dacca Horan.
 Musa × sapidisiaca K.C.Jacob, nom. superfl.
 Musa × sapientum L., and many of its varietal names, including M. × sapientum var. paradisiaca (L.) Baker, nom. illeg.

Generally, modern classifications of banana cultivars follow Simmonds and Shepherd's system. Cultivars are placed in groups based on the number of chromosomes they have and which species they are derived from. Thus the Latundan banana is placed in the AAB Group, showing that it is a triploid derived from both M. acuminata (A) and M. balbisiana (B). For a list of the cultivars classified under this system, see "List of banana cultivars".

In 2012, a team of scientists announced they had achieved a draft sequence of the genome of Musa acuminata.

Bananas and plantains
In regions such as North America and Europe, Musa fruits offered for sale can be divided into "bananas" and "plantains" (cooking banana), based on their intended use as food. Thus the banana producer and distributor Chiquita produces publicity material for the American market which says that "a plantain is not a banana". The stated differences are that plantains are more starchy and less sweet; they are eaten cooked rather than raw; they have thicker skin, which may be green, yellow or black; and they can be used at any stage of ripeness. Linnaeus made the same distinction between plantains and bananas when first naming two "species" of Musa. Members of the "plantain subgroup" of banana cultivars, most important as food in West Africa and Latin America, correspond to the Chiquita description, having long pointed fruit. They are described by Ploetz et al. as "true" plantains, distinct from other cooking bananas. The cooking bananas of East Africa belong to a different group, the East African Highland bananas, so would not qualify as "true" plantains on this definition.

An alternative approach divides bananas into dessert bananas and cooking bananas, with plantains being one of the subgroups of cooking bananas. Triploid cultivars derived solely from M. acuminata are examples of "dessert bananas", whereas triploid cultivars derived from the hybrid between M. acuminata and M. balbisiana (in particular the plantain subgroup of the AAB Group) are "plantains". Small farmers in Colombia grow a much wider range of cultivars than large commercial plantations. A study of these cultivars showed that they could be placed into at least three groups based on their characteristics: dessert bananas, non-plantain cooking bananas, and plantains, although there were overlaps between dessert and cooking bananas.

In Southeast Asia—the center of diversity for bananas, both wild and cultivated—the distinction between "bananas" and "plantains" does not work, according to Valmayor et al. Many bananas are used both raw and cooked. There are starchy cooking bananas which are smaller than those eaten raw. The range of colors, sizes and shapes is far wider than in those grown or sold in Africa, Europe or the Americas. Southeast Asian languages do not make the distinction between "bananas" and "plantains" that is made in English (and Spanish). Thus both Cavendish cultivars, the classic yellow dessert bananas, and Saba cultivars, used mainly for cooking, are called pisang in Malaysia and Indonesia, kluai in Thailand and chuối in Vietnam. Fe'i bananas, grown and eaten in the islands of the Pacific, are derived from entirely different wild species than traditional bananas and plantains. Most Fe'i bananas are cooked, but Karat bananas, which are short and squat with bright red skins, very different from the usual yellow dessert bananas, are eaten raw.

In summary, in commerce in Europe and the Americas (although not in small-scale cultivation), it is possible to distinguish between "bananas", which are eaten raw, and "plantains", which are cooked. In other regions of the world, particularly India, Southeast Asia and the islands of the Pacific, there are many more kinds of banana and the two-fold distinction is not useful and not made in local languages. Plantains are one of many kinds of cooking bananas, which are not always distinct from dessert bananas.

Historical cultivation

Early cultivation

The earliest domestication of bananas (Musa spp.) was from naturally occurring parthenocarpic (seedless) individuals of Musa banksii in New Guinea. These were cultivated by Papuans before the arrival of Austronesian-speakers. Numerous phytoliths of bananas have been recovered from the Kuk Swamp archaeological site and dated to around 10,000 to 6,500 BP. Foraging humans in this area began domestication in the late Pleistocene using transplantation and early cultivation methods. Various investigations  including Denham et al., 2003  determine that by the early to middle of the Holocene the process was complete. From New Guinea, cultivated bananas spread westward into Island Southeast Asia through proximity (not migrations). They hybridized with other (possibly independently domesticated) subspecies of Musa acuminata as well as Musa balbisiana in the Philippines, northern New Guinea, and possibly Halmahera. These hybridization events produced the triploid cultivars of bananas commonly grown today. From Island Southeast Asia, they became part of the staple domesticated crops of Austronesian peoples and were spread during their voyages and ancient maritime trading routes into Oceania, East Africa, South Asia, and Indochina.

These ancient introductions resulted in the banana subgroup now known as the "true" plantains, which include the East African Highland bananas and the Pacific plantains (the Iholena and Maoli-Popo'ulu subgroups). East African Highland bananas originated from banana populations introduced to Madagascar probably from the region between Java, Borneo, and New Guinea; while Pacific plantains were introduced to the Pacific Islands from either eastern New Guinea or the Bismarck Archipelago.

Phytolith discoveries in Cameroon dating to the first millennium BCE triggered an as yet unresolved debate about the date of first cultivation in Africa. There is linguistic evidence that bananas were known in Madagascar around that time. The earliest prior evidence indicates that cultivation dates to no earlier than late 6th century CE. It is likely, however, that bananas were brought at least to Madagascar if not to the East African coast during the phase of Malagasy colonization of the island from South East Asia c. 400 CE.

Glucanase and two other proteins specific to bananas were found in dental calculus from early Iron Age (12th century BCE) Philistines in Tel Erani in the southern Levant.

Another wave of introductions later spread bananas to other parts of tropical Asia, particularly Indochina and the Indian subcontinent. However, there is evidence that bananas were known to the Indus Valley civilisation from phytoliths recovered from the Kot Diji archaeological site in Pakistan (although they are absent in other contemporary sites in South Asia). This may be a possible indication of very early dispersal of bananas by Austronesian traders by sea from as early as 2000 BCE. But this is still putative, as they may have come from local wild Musa species used for fiber or as ornamentals, not food.

Southeast Asia remains the region of primary diversity of the banana. Areas of secondary diversity are found in Africa, indicating a long history of banana cultivation in these regions.

The banana may also have been present in isolated locations elsewhere in the Middle East on the eve of Islam. The spread of Islam was followed by far-reaching diffusion. There are numerous references to it in Islamic texts (such as poems and hadiths) beginning in the 9th century. By the 10th century the banana appears in texts from Palestine and Egypt. From there it diffused into North Africa and Muslim Iberia. An article on banana tree cultivation is included in Ibn al-'Awwam's 12th-century agricultural work, Book on Agriculture. During the medieval ages, bananas from Granada were considered among the best in the Arab world. In 650, Islamic conquerors brought the banana to Palestine. Today, banana consumption increases significantly in Islamic countries during Ramadan, the month of daylight fasting.

Bananas were certainly grown in the Christian Kingdom of Cyprus by the late medieval period. Writing in 1458, the Italian traveller and writer Gabriele Capodilista wrote favourably of the extensive farm produce of the estates at Episkopi, near modern-day Limassol, including the region's banana plantations.

Bananas (as well as coconuts) were encountered by European explorers during the Magellan expedition in 1521, in both Guam and the Philippines. Lacking a name for the fruit, the ship's historian Antonio Pigafetta described them as "figs more than one palm long." Bananas were introduced to South America by Portuguese sailors who brought the fruits from West Africa in the 16th century. Southeast Asian banana cultivars, as well as abaca grown for fibers, were also introduced to New Spain (North and Central America) by the Spanish from the Philippines, via the Manila galleons.

Many wild banana species as well as cultivars exist in extraordinary diversity in India, China, and Southeast Asia.

Plantation cultivation in the Caribbean, Central and South America

In the 15th and 16th centuries, Portuguese colonists started banana plantations in the Atlantic Islands, Brazil, and western Africa. North Americans began consuming bananas on a small scale at very high prices shortly after the Civil War, though it was only in the 1880s that the food became more widespread. As late as the Victorian Era, bananas were not widely known in Europe, although they were available. Jules Verne introduces bananas to his readers with detailed descriptions in Around the World in Eighty Days (1872).

The earliest modern plantations originated in Jamaica and the related Western Caribbean Zone, including most of Central America. It involved the combination of modern transportation networks of steamships and railroads with the development of refrigeration that allowed more time between harvesting and ripening. North American shippers like Lorenzo Dow Baker and Andrew Preston, the founders of the Boston Fruit Company started this process in the 1870s, but railroad builders like Minor C. Keith also participated, eventually culminating in the multi-national giant corporations like today's Chiquita Brands International and Dole. These companies were monopolistic, vertically integrated (meaning they controlled growing, processing, shipping and marketing) and usually used political manipulation to build enclave economies (economies that were internally self-sufficient, virtually tax exempt, and export-oriented that contribute very little to the host economy). Their political maneuvers, which gave rise to the term banana republic for states such as Honduras and Guatemala, included working with local elites and their rivalries to influence politics or playing the international interests of the United States, especially during the Cold War, to keep the political climate favorable to their interests.

Peasant cultivation for export in the Caribbean

The vast majority of the world's bananas today are cultivated for family consumption or for sale on local markets. India is the world leader in this sort of production, but many other Asian and African countries where climate and soil conditions allow cultivation also host large populations of banana growers who sell at least some of their crop.

Peasant sector banana growers produce for the world market in the Caribbean, however. The Windward Islands are notable for the growing, largely of Cavendish bananas, for an international market, generally in Europe but also in North America. In the Caribbean, and especially in Dominica where this sort of cultivation is widespread, holdings are in the 1–2 acre range. In many cases the farmer earns additional money from other crops, from engaging in labor outside the farm, and from a share of the earnings of relatives living overseas.

Banana crops are vulnerable to destruction by high winds, such as tropical storms or cyclones.

Modern cultivation

All widely cultivated bananas today descend from the two wild bananas Musa acuminata and Musa balbisiana. While the original wild bananas contained large seeds, diploid or polyploid cultivars (some being hybrids) with tiny seeds or triploid hybrids without seeds are preferred for human raw fruit consumption, as banana seeds are large and hard and spiky and liable to crack teeth. These are propagated asexually from offshoots. The plant is allowed to produce two shoots at a time; a larger one for immediate fruiting and a smaller "sucker" or "follower" to produce fruit in 6–8 months.

As a non-seasonal crop, bananas are available fresh year-round.

Cavendish

In global commerce in 2009, by far the most important cultivars belonged to the triploid AAA group of Musa acuminata, commonly referred to as Cavendish group bananas. They accounted for the majority of banana exports, despite only coming into existence in 1836. The cultivars Dwarf Cavendish and Grand Nain (Chiquita Banana) gained popularity in the 1950s after the previous mass-produced cultivar, Gros Michel (also an AAA group cultivar), became commercially unviable due to Panama disease, caused by the fungus Fusarium oxysporum which attacks the roots of the banana plant. Cavendish cultivars are resistant to the Panama disease, but in 2013 there were fears that the black sigatoka fungus would in turn make Cavendish bananas unviable.

Even though it is no longer viable for large scale cultivation, Gros Michel is not extinct and is still grown in areas where Panama disease is not found. Likewise, Dwarf Cavendish and Grand Nain are in no danger of extinction, but they may leave supermarket shelves if disease makes it impossible to supply the global market. It is unclear if any existing cultivar can replace Cavendish bananas, so various hybridisation and genetic engineering programs are attempting to create a disease-resistant, mass-market banana.  One such strain that has emerged is the Taiwanese Cavendish, also known as the Formosana.

Ripening

Export bananas are picked green, and ripen in special rooms upon arrival in the destination country. These rooms are air-tight and filled with ethylene gas to induce ripening. The vivid yellow color consumers normally associate with supermarket bananas is, in fact, caused by the artificial ripening process. Flavor and texture are also affected by ripening temperature. Bananas are refrigerated to between  during transport. At lower temperatures, ripening permanently stalls, and the bananas turn gray as cell walls break down. The skin of ripe bananas quickly blackens in the  environment of a domestic refrigerator, although the fruit inside remains unaffected.

Bananas can be ordered by the retailer "ungassed" (i.e. not treated with ethylene), and may show up at the supermarket fully green.  (green bananas) that have not been gassed will never fully ripen before becoming rotten. Instead of fresh eating, these bananas can be used for cooking, as seen in Jamaican cuisine.

A 2008 study reported that ripe bananas fluoresce when exposed to ultraviolet light. This property is attributed to the degradation of chlorophyll leading to the accumulation of a fluorescent product in the skin of the fruit. The chlorophyll breakdown product is stabilized by a propionate ester group. Banana-plant leaves also fluoresce in the same way. Green (under-ripe) bananas do not fluoresce. That paper suggested that this fluorescence could be put to use "for optical in vivo monitoring of ripening and over-ripening of bananas and other fruit".

Storage and transport
Bananas must be transported over long distances from the tropics to world markets. To obtain maximum shelf life, harvest comes before the fruit is mature. The fruit requires careful handling, rapid transport to ports, cooling, and refrigerated shipping. The goal is to prevent the bananas from producing their natural ripening agent, ethylene. After a few days, the fruit begins to ripen and is distributed for final sale. Ripe bananas can be held for a few days at home. If bananas are too green, they can be put in a brown paper bag with an apple or tomato overnight to speed up the ripening process.

Carbon dioxide (which bananas produce) and ethylene absorbents extend fruit life even at high temperatures. This effect can be exploited by packing banana in a polyethylene bag and including an ethylene absorbent, e.g., potassium permanganate, on an inert carrier. The bag is then sealed with a band or string. This treatment has been shown to more than double lifespans up to 3–4 weeks without the need for refrigeration.

Sustainability 
The excessive use of fertilizers often left in abandoned plantations contributes greatly to eutrophication in local streams and lakes, and harms aquatic life after algal blooms deprive fish of oxygen. It has been theorized that destruction of 60% of coral reefs along the coasts of Costa Rica is partially from sediments from banana plantations. Another issue is the deforestation associated with expanding banana production. As monocultures rapidly deplete soil nutrients plantations expand to areas with rich soils and cut down forests, which also affects soil erosion and degradation, and increases frequency of flooding. The World Wildlife Fund (WWF) stated that banana production produced more waste than any other agricultural sector, mostly from discarded banana plants, bags used to cover the bananas, strings to tie them, and containers for transport.

Voluntary sustainability standards such as Rainforest Alliance and Fairtrade are increasingly being used to address some of these issues. Bananas production certified by such sustainability standards experienced a 43% compound annual growth rate from 2008 to 2016, to represent 36% of banana exports.

Breeding 
Mutation breeding can be used in this crop. Jankowicz-Cieslak & Ingelbrecht 2022 provides lab protocols from cutting knife to sequencer to computer code for screening mutants.

Aneuploidy is a source of significant variation in allotriploid varieties (the ABBs and AABs). For one example, it can be a source of TR4 resistance. Jankowicz-Cieslak & Ingelbrecht 2022 provides lab protocols to screen for such aberrations and for possible resulting disease resistances. (See .)

Production and export

In 2017, world production of bananas and plantains combined was 153 million tonnes, led by India and China with a combined total of 27% of global production. Other major producers were the Philippines, Colombia, Indonesia, Ecuador, and  Brazil.
 
As reported for 2013, total world exports were 20 million tonnes of bananas and 859,000 tonnes of plantains. Ecuador and the Philippines were the leading exporters with 5.4 and 3.3 million tonnes, respectively, and the Dominican Republic was the leading exporter of plantains with 210,350 tonnes.

Developing countries

Bananas and plantains constitute a major staple food crop for millions of people in developing countries. In many tropical countries, green (unripe) bananas used for cooking represent the main cultivars. Most producers are small-scale farmers either for home consumption or local markets. Because bananas and plantains produce fruit year-round, they provide a valuable food source during the hunger season (when the food from one annual/semi-annual harvest has been consumed, and the next is still to come). Bananas and plantains are important for global food security.

Pests, diseases, and natural disasters

Although in no danger of outright extinction, the most common edible banana cultivar Cavendish (extremely popular in Europe and the Americas) could become unviable for large-scale cultivation in the next 10–20 years. Its predecessor 'Gros Michel', discovered in the 1820s, suffered this fate. Like almost all bananas, Cavendish lacks genetic diversity, which makes it vulnerable to diseases, threatening both commercial cultivation and small-scale subsistence farming. Within the data gathered from the genes of hundreds of bananas, Botanist, Julie Sardos, of the Bioversity International research group, along with her colleagues found proof that at least several wild banana ancestors exist that are currently unknown to scientists, which could provide a means of defense against banana crop diseases. 

Some commentators remarked that those variants which could replace what much of the world considers a "typical banana" are so different that most people would not consider them the same fruit, and blame the decline of the banana on monogenetic cultivation driven by short-term commercial motives. Overall, fungal diseases are disproportionately important to small island developing states.

Panama disease
Panama disease is caused by a fusarium soil fungus (Race 1), which enters the plants through the roots and travels with water into the trunk and leaves, producing gels and gums that cut off the flow of water and nutrients, causing the plant to wilt, and exposing the rest of the plant to lethal amounts of sunlight. Prior to 1960, almost all commercial banana production centered on "Gros Michel", which was highly susceptible. Cavendish was chosen as the replacement for Gros Michel because, among resistant cultivars, it produces the highest quality fruit. However, more care is required for shipping the Cavendish, and its quality compared to Gros Michel is debated.

According to current sources, a deadly form of Panama disease is infecting Cavendish. All plants are genetically identical, which prevents evolution of disease resistance. Researchers are examining hundreds of wild varieties for resistance.

Tropical race 4
Tropical Race 4 (TR4), a reinvigorated strain of Panama disease, was first discovered in 1993. This virulent form of fusarium wilt destroyed Cavendish in several southeast Asian countries and spread to Australia and India. As the soil-based fungi can easily be carried on boots, clothing, or tools, the wilt spread to the Americas despite years of preventive efforts. Cavendish is highly susceptible to TR4, and over time, Cavendish is endangered for commercial production by this disease. The only known defense to TR4 is genetic resistance. This is conferred either by RGA2, a gene isolated from a TR4-resistant diploid banana, or by the nematode-derived Ced9. This is best achieved by genetic modification, such as in the Dale banana disclosed in Dale et al., 2017. Experts state the need to enrich banana biodiversity by producing diverse new banana varieties, not just having a focus on the Cavendish.

Black sigatoka
Black sigatoka is a fungal leaf spot disease first observed in Fiji in 1963 or 1964. Black Sigatoka (also known as black leaf streak) has spread to banana plantations throughout the tropics from infected banana leaves that were used as packing material. It affects all main cultivars of bananas and plantains (including the Cavendish cultivars), impeding photosynthesis by blackening parts of the leaves, eventually killing the entire leaf. Starved for energy, fruit production falls by 50% or more, and the bananas that do grow ripen prematurely, making them unsuitable for export. The fungus has shown ever-increasing resistance to treatment, with the current expense for treating  exceeding US$1,000 per year. In addition to the expense, there is the question of how long intensive spraying can be environmentally justified.

Banana bunchy top virus
Banana bunchy top virus (BBTV) is a plant virus of the genus Babuvirus, family Nanonviridae affecting Musa spp. (including banana, abaca, plantain and ornamental bananas) and Ensete spp. in the family Musaceae. Banana bunchy top disease (BBTD) symptoms include dark green streaks of variable length in leaf veins, midribs and petioles. Leaves become short and stunted as the disease progresses, becoming 'bunched' at the apex of the plant. Infected plants may produce no fruit or the bunch may not emerge from the pseudostem. The virus is transmitted by the banana aphid Pentalonia nigronervosa and is widespread in SE Asia, Asia, the Philippines, Taiwan, Oceania and parts of Africa. There is no cure for BBTD, but it can be effectively controlled by the eradication of diseased plants and the use of virus-free planting material. No resistant cultivars have been found, but varietal differences in susceptibility have been reported. The commercially important Cavendish subgroup is severely affected.

Banana bacterial wilt

Banana bacterial wilt (BBW) is a bacterial disease caused by Xanthomonas campestris pv. musacearum. After being originally identified on a close relative of bananas, Ensete ventricosum, in Ethiopia in the 1960s, BBW occurred in Uganda in 2001 affecting all banana cultivars. Since then BBW has been diagnosed in Central and East Africa including the banana growing regions of Rwanda, the Democratic Republic of the Congo, Tanzania, Kenya, Burundi, and Uganda.

Conservation

Given the narrow range of genetic diversity present in bananas and the many threats via biotic (pests and diseases) and abiotic (such as drought) stress, conservation of the full spectrum of banana genetic resources is ongoing. Banana germplasm is conserved in many national and regional gene banks, and at the world's largest banana collection, the International Musa Germplasm Transit Centre (ITC), managed by Bioversity International and hosted at KU Leuven in Belgium. Musa cultivars are usually seedless, and options for their long-term conservation are constrained by the vegetative nature of the plant's reproductive system. Consequently, they are conserved by three main methods: in vivo (planted in field collections), in vitro (as plantlets in test tubes within a controlled environment), and by cryopreservation (meristems conserved in liquid nitrogen at −196 °C). At the Honduran Foundation for Agricultural Research there were attempts to exploit the rare cases of seed production to create disease-resistant varieties; 30,000 commercial banana plants were hand-pollinated with pollen from wild fertile Asian fruit, producing 400 tonnes, which contained about fifteen seeds, of which four or five germinated." Further breeding with wild bananas yielded a new seedless variety resistant to both black Sigatoka and Panama disease.

Genes from wild banana species are conserved as DNA and as cryopreserved pollen and banana seeds from wild species are also conserved, although less commonly, as they are difficult to regenerate. In addition, bananas and their crop wild relatives are conserved in situ (in wild natural habitats where they evolved and continue to do so). Diversity is also conserved in farmers' fields where continuous cultivation, adaptation and improvement of cultivars is often carried out by small-scale farmers growing traditional local cultivars.

Nutrition 

Raw bananas (not including the peel) are 75% water, 23% carbohydrates, 1% protein, and contain negligible fat. A 100-gram reference serving supplies 89 Calories, 31% of the US recommended Daily Value (DV) of vitamin B6, and moderate amounts of vitamin C, manganese and dietary fiber, with no other micronutrients in significant content (see table).

Ripe dessert bananas are soft, bland, and easily digestible, making them ideal for those with gastrointestinal distress. Therefore bananas are part of the BRAT diet.

Potassium
Although bananas are commonly thought to contain exceptional potassium content, their actual potassium content is not high per typical food serving, having only 8% of the US recommended Daily Value for potassium (considered a low level of the DV, see nutrition table), and their potassium-content ranking among fruits, vegetables, legumes, and many other foods is relatively moderate. Foods with higher potassium content than raw dessert bananas (326 mg per 100 g) include ground flaxseed (793 mg per 100 g), dry-roasted almonds (684 mg per 100 g), peanut butter (654 mg per 100 g), raw baby spinach (582 mg per 100 g), white button mushrooms (393 mg per 100 g), and whole grain oats (350 mg per 100 g). Raw yellow plantains contain 487 mg potassium per 100 g. Dehydrated dessert bananas (banana powder) contain 1490 mg potassium per 100 g.

Allergen
Individuals with a latex allergy may experience a reaction to bananas.

Culture

Food and cooking

Fruit
Bananas are a staple starch for many tropical populations. Depending upon cultivar and ripeness, the flesh can vary in taste from starchy to sweet, and texture from firm to mushy. Both the skin and inner part can be eaten raw or cooked. The primary component of the aroma of fresh bananas is isoamyl acetate (also known as banana oil), which, along with several other compounds such as butyl acetate and isobutyl acetate, is a significant contributor to banana flavor.

During the ripening process, bananas produce the gas ethylene, which acts as a plant hormone and indirectly affects the flavor. Among other things, ethylene stimulates the formation of amylase, an enzyme that breaks down starch into sugar, influencing the taste of bananas. The greener, less ripe bananas contain higher levels of starch and, consequently, have a "starchier" taste. On the other hand, yellow bananas taste sweeter due to higher sugar concentrations. Furthermore, ethylene signals the production of pectinase, an enzyme which breaks down the pectin between the cells of the banana, causing the banana to soften as it ripens.

In addition to being eaten raw, bananas are eaten deep fried, baked in their skin in a split bamboo, or steamed in glutinous rice wrapped in a banana leaf. Bananas can be made into fruit preserves. Banana pancakes are popular among travelers in South Asia and Southeast Asia. This has elicited the expression Banana Pancake Trail for those places in Asia that cater to these travelers. Banana chips are a snack produced from sliced dehydrated or fried banana or plantain, which have a dark brown color and an intense banana taste. Dried bananas are also ground to make banana flour. Extracting juice is difficult, because when a banana is compressed, it simply turns to pulp. Bananas feature prominently in Philippine cuisine, being part of traditional dishes and desserts like maruya, turón, and halo-halo or saba con yelo. Most of these dishes use the Saba Banana or Cardaba banana cultivar. Bananas are also commonly used in cuisine in the South-Indian state of Kerala, where they are steamed (puzhungiyathu), made into curries, fried into chips, (upperi) or fried in batter (pazhampori). Pisang goreng, bananas fried with batter similar to the Filipino maruya or Kerala pazhampori, is a popular dessert in Malaysia, Singapore, and Indonesia. A similar dish is known in the United Kingdom and United States as banana fritters.

Plantains are used in various stews and curries or cooked, baked or mashed in much the same way as potatoes, such as the pazham pachadi dish prepared in Kerala.

Flower

Banana flowers (also called "banana hearts" or "banana blossoms") are used as a vegetable in South Asian and Southeast Asian cuisine, either raw or steamed with dips or cooked in soups, curries and fried foods. The flavor resembles that of artichoke. As with artichokes, both the fleshy part of the bracts and the heart are edible.

Leaves

Banana leaves are large, flexible, and waterproof. While generally too tough to actually be eaten, they are often used as ecologically friendly disposable food containers or as "plates" in South Asia and several Southeast Asian countries. In Indonesian cuisine, banana leaf is employed in cooking methods like pepes and botok; banana leaf packages containing food ingredients and spices are cooked in steam or in boiled water, or are grilled on charcoal. When used so for steaming or grilling, the banana leaves protect the food ingredients from burning and add a subtle sweet flavor. In South India, it is customary to serve traditional food on a banana leaf. In Tamil Nadu (India), dried banana leaves are used as to pack food and to make cups to hold liquid food items.

Trunk

The tender core of the banana plant's trunk is also used in South Asian and Southeast Asian cuisine. Examples include the Burmese dish mohinga, and the Filipino dishes inubaran and kadyos, manok, kag ubad.

Fiber

Textiles

Banana fiber harvested from the pseudostems and leaves of the plant has been used for textiles in Asia since at least the 13th century. Both fruit-bearing and fibrous varieties of the banana plant have been used. In the Japanese system Kijōka-bashōfu, leaves and shoots are cut from the plant periodically to ensure softness. Harvested shoots are first boiled in lye to prepare fibers for yarn-making. These banana shoots produce fibers of varying degrees of softness, yielding yarns and textiles with differing qualities for specific uses. For example, the outermost fibers of the shoots are the coarsest, and are suitable for tablecloths, while the softest innermost fibers are desirable for kimono and kamishimo. This traditional Japanese cloth-making process requires many steps, all performed by hand.

In India, a banana fiber separator machine has been developed, which takes the agricultural waste of local banana harvests and extracts strands of the fiber.

Paper

Banana fiber is used in the production of banana paper. Banana paper is made from two different parts: the bark of the banana plant, mainly used for artistic purposes, or from the fibers of the stem and non-usable fruits. The paper is either hand-made or by industrial process.

Cultural roles

Arts
 The song "Yes! We Have No Bananas" was written by Frank Silver and Irving Cohn and originally released in 1923; for many decades, it was the best-selling sheet music in history. Since then the song has been rerecorded several times and has been particularly popular during banana shortages.
 A person slipping on a banana peel has been a staple of physical comedy for generations. An American comedy recording from 1910 features a popular character of the time, "Uncle Josh", claiming to describe his own such incident:

 
 The poet Bashō is named after the Japanese word for a banana plant. The "bashō" planted in his garden by a grateful student became a source of inspiration to his poetry, as well as a symbol of his life and home.
 The cover artwork for the debut album of The Velvet Underground features a banana made by Andy Warhol. On the original vinyl LP version, the design allowed the listener to "peel" this banana to find a pink, peeled phallic banana on the inside.
 Italian artist Maurizio Cattelan created a concept art piece titled Comedian involving taping a banana to a wall using silver duct tape. The piece was exhibited briefly at the Art Basel in Miami before being removed from the exhibition and eaten sans permission in another artistic stunt titled Hungry Artist by New York artist David Datuna.

Religion and popular beliefs

In India, bananas serve a prominent part in many festivals and occasions of Hindus. In South Indian weddings, particularly Tamil weddings, banana trees are tied in pairs to form an arch as a blessing to the couple for a long-lasting, useful life.

In Thailand, it is believed that a certain type of banana plant may be inhabited by a spirit, Nang Tani, a type of ghost related to trees and similar plants that manifests itself as a young woman. Often people tie a length of colored satin cloth around the pseudostem of the banana plants.

In Malay folklore, the ghost known as Pontianak is associated with banana plants (pokok pisang), and its spirit is said to reside in them during the day.

Racist symbol
There is a long racist history of describing people of African descent as being more like monkeys than humans, and due to the assumption in popular culture that monkeys like bananas, bananas have been used in symbolic acts of hate speech.

Particularly in Europe, bananas have long been commonly thrown at black footballers by racist spectators. In April 2014, during a match at Villarreal's stadium, El Madrigal, Dani Alves was targeted by Villareal supporter David Campaya Lleo, who threw a banana at him. Alves picked up the banana, peeled it and took a bite, and the meme went viral on social media in support of him.  Racist taunts are an ongoing problem in football.   Bananas were hung from nooses around the campus of American University in May 2017 after the student body elected its first black woman student government president.

"Banana" is also a slur aimed at some Asian people, that are said to be "yellow on the outside, white on the inside". Used primarily by East or Southeast Asians for other East/Southeast Asians or Asian Americans who are perceived as assimilated into mainstream American culture.

Unicode
The Unicode standard includes the emoji character .

Other uses

 In internet culture, bananas are sometimes included in images as a reference for the size of other objects in the image. This use, often accompanied with the text "banana for scale", became an internet meme.
 The large leaves may be used as umbrellas.
 Banana peel may have capability to extract heavy metal contamination from river water, similar to other purification materials.  In 2007, banana peel powder was tested as a means of filtration for heavy metals and radionuclides occurring in water produced by the nuclear and fertilizer industries (cadmium contaminant is present in phosphates). When added and thoroughly mixed for 40 minutes, the powder can remove roughly 65% of heavy metals, and this can be repeated.
 Waste bananas can be used to feed livestock.

See also 
 Domesticated plants and animals of Austronesia
 List of banana dishes
 United Brands Company v Commission of the European Communities

References

Bibliography

Further reading
 Harriet Lamb, Fighting the Banana Wars and Other Fairtrade Battles,

External links
 Kew plant profile: Musa acuminata (banana)
 

 
Berries
Fruits originating in Asia
Fiber plants
Staple foods
Tropical agriculture
Edible fruits